The Hours Tour was a small-scale promotional concert tour by David Bowie comprising a handful of live performances and numerous television appearances in support of the album Hours in late 1999. Several live songs from the tour were included as b-sides to singles from the album, and concert recordings from the tour were released in 2020 as Something in the Air (Live Paris 99) and in 2021 with David Bowie At The Kit Kat Klub (Live New York 99).

Background
Bowie had released his album Hours in October 1999, and embarked on a short, mostly-promotional set of shows to promote the album. On 23 August, prior to the album's release, he appeared on VH1's Storytellers, released in 2009 as VH1 Storytellers. For the rest of the shows, guitarist Page Hamilton, founding member of Helmet, was drafted to replace Reeves Gabrels whose final performance and association with Bowie ended with the Storytellers performance. Rumours of a split were initially denied by both parties until a few months later when Gabrels guitarist admitted that he and Bowie had drifted apart.

In October, Bowie appeared on the 25th season of Saturday Night Live and played "Thursday's Child" and "Rebel Rebel".

The Libro Music Hall, Vienna, performance on 17 October 1999, coinciding with the launch of BowieNet Europe was made available as a live webcast.

Something in the Air (Live Paris 99)

The Elysée Montmartre performance on 14 October 1999 was filmed and recorded with three songs later appearing on the CD single of "Survive"; the full concert was eventually released in 2020 as Something in the Air (Live Paris 99). The concert is notable for being recorded one day after Bowie received the rank of Commander in the Ordre des Arts et des Lettres by the French government for his contributions to art and music. Something in the Air was released on CD and vinyl for the first time in early 2021, part of the live series Brilliant Live Adventures.

Track listing
 "Life on Mars?"
 "Thursday's Child"
 "Something in the Air"
 "Word on a Wing"
 "Can't Help Thinking About Me"
 "China Girl"
 "Always Crashing in the Same Car"
 "Survive"
 "Drive-In Saturday"
 "Changes"
 "Seven"
 "Repetition"
 "I Can't Read"
 "The Pretty Things Are Going to Hell"
 "Rebel Rebel"

These live versions of "Thursday's Child", "Survive" and "Seven" were previously released as b-sides to Bowie's 2000 single release of "Survive". Something in the Air reached #16 on the UK album charts.

David Bowie at the Kit Kat Klub (Live New York 99)

In November 1999, Bowie performed a concert at the small Kit Kat Klub in New York to invitees and contest winners. This show was filmed as part of the American Express Blue Concert series transmitted on 7 December 1999, in addition to a simulcast radio broadcast by SFX Radio network on the same date, and eventually released on a promotional-only CD that pared the setlist down to 12 songs. The webcast, reportedly one of the first live streams of a concert, was fraught with issues and was described as going "not particularly smooth." This live release, sourced from the same promotional CD released in late 1999/early 2000 was announced on 17 March 2021 and released on 2 April 2021. Live at the Kit Kat Klub reached #20 in the UK and #93 in Ireland upon its release.

Track listing
"Life on Mars?"
"Thursday's Child"
"Something in the Air"
"China Girl"
"Can't Help Thinking About Me"
"Always Crashing in the Same Car"
"Survive"
"Drive-In Saturday"
"Stay"
"Seven"
"Changes"
"Cracked Actor"
"Ashes to Ashes"
"Repetition"
"The Pretty Things Are Going to Hell"
"Rebel Rebel"
"I'm Afraid of Americans"

 italics denotes songs performed at the show, but not included on the live recording.

Tour band
David Bowie – vocals, acoustic guitar
Reeves Gabrels – lead guitar, 23 August 1999 only
Page Hamilton – lead and rhythm guitar, 9 October onwards
Mark Plati – rhythm guitar, acoustic guitar, bass guitar, backing vocals, music director
Gail Ann Dorsey – bass guitar, rhythm guitar, backing vocals
Sterling Campbell – drums, percussion
Mike Garson – keyboards, piano
Holly Palmer – backing vocals, percussion
Emm Gryner – backing vocals

Tour dates

Songs

From Hunky Dory
 "Changes"
 "Life on Mars?"
From Aladdin Sane
 "Drive-In Saturday"
 "Cracked Actor"
From Diamond Dogs
 "Rebel Rebel"
From Station to Station
 "Word on a Wing"
 "Stay"
From Low
 "Always Crashing in the Same Car"
From Lodger
 "Repetition"
From Scary Monsters (And Super Creeps)
 "Ashes to Ashes"

From Let's Dance
 "China Girl" (originally from The Idiot (1977) by Iggy Pop; written by Pop and Bowie)
From Tin Machine
 "I Can't Read" (Bowie, Reeves Gabrels)
From Earthling
 "I'm Afraid of Americans" (Bowie, Brian Eno)
From Hours
 "Thursday's Child" (Bowie, Gabrels)
 "Something in the Air" (Bowie, Gabrels)
 "Survive" (Bowie, Gabrels)
 "If I'm Dreaming My Life" (Bowie, Gabrels)
 "Seven" (Bowie, Gabrels)
 "The Pretty Things Are Going to Hell" (Bowie, Gabrels)
Other songs:
 "Can't Help Thinking About Me" (early non-album single released in 1966)

References

1999 concert tours
David Bowie concert tours